Mark Ladner is a Cambridge, Massachusetts based chef and restaurateur, who owns Bar Enza in Harvard Square.

Biography
Ladner was raised in Belmont, Massachusetts.

Career
His first job was at Café Fiorella, also in Harvard Square. After graduating from Johnson & Wales University, he went to work for Todd English at Olives. Ladner worked there with Marc Orfaly and Barbara Lynch. He moved to Manhattan and became executive chef at Del Posto until 2017. While there, he won a James Beard Foundation Award for Best Chef in New York City and two Michelin Stars. The New York Times gave the restaurant a four star review. While in NYC, Ladner also worked for Scott Bryan and Jean-Georges Vongerichten.

At Del Posto, he was known for his 100 layer lasagna.

Television
In 2005, he served as Mario Batali’s sous chef on Iron Chef America alongside Anne Burrell.  When he appeared on Beat Bobby Flay, he competed against Flay but Flay won.

References

Chefs from Massachusetts
Johnson & Wales University alumni
People from Belmont, Massachusetts
American restaurateurs
American male chefs
Living people
Year of birth missing (living people)